Blunt end may refer to:

 Sticky and blunt ends
 The flat end cab of the British Rail Class 91, commonly called the blunt end cab